Cross Keys is an unincorporated community in Macon County, Alabama, United States.

History
Cross Keys is located south of the former Montgomery and West Point Railroad. The community was named in honor of Cross Keys, South Carolina, the birthplace of early settler J. H. Howard. A post office operated under the name Cross Keys from 1837 to 1906. The community was formerly home to a high school.

References

Unincorporated communities in Macon County, Alabama
Unincorporated communities in Alabama
Columbus metropolitan area, Georgia
1837 establishments in Alabama